Jesper Andersen (born May 31, 1979) is a retired Danish professional football (soccer) player, who played as a defender.

He is best known for his many appearances in the Danish Superliga playing for OB, AGF and Viborg FF. All in all he appeared in 167 matches in the Danish Superliga

Late in his career he was troubled by a knee injury, which led to a career-stop in the fall of 2008. Though he later reappeared in the Viborg FF squad for half a season, but had to leave the club in June 2009, after he had been struck by yet another injury.

References

External links
Danish national team profile

Jesper Andersen is listed in the following standard biographical references:

 Germaine, Max. Artists and Galleries of Australia, Volumes 1 & 2, Third Edition. Craftsman Press, Sydney, 1990. Page 10

1979 births
Living people
Danish men's footballers
Denmark under-21 international footballers
Odense Boldklub players
Aarhus Gymnastikforening players
Viborg FF players
Vendsyssel FF players
Footballers from Odense
Association football defenders